Samuele Spalluto (born 15 February 2001) is an Italian professional footballer who plays as a centre-forward for  club Novara, on loan from Fiorentina.

Club career
Raised in the youth academies of Lecce and Fiorentina, on 15 July 2021 Spalluto was loaned to Serie C club Gubbio, where he made his professional debut on 5 September, coming on as a substitute in the final minutes of a 1–0 league win over Fermana. He then scored his first professional goal on 19 October, in a 4–0 league win over Carrarese.

On 13 July 2022, Spalluto was sent on a season-long loan to Serie B side Ternana, with an option to buy included in the deal. He made his league debut for the club on 27 August 2022, coming on as a substitute for Andrea Favilli in a 4–1 away loss against Modena.

After collecting just three appearances in the first part of the season, on 12 January 2023 Spalluto was re-called by Fiorentina and loaned to Serie C club Novara until the end of the campaign.

References

External links
 
 

2001 births
Sportspeople from the Province of Brindisi
Footballers from Apulia
Living people
Italian footballers
Association football forwards
A.S. Gubbio 1910 players
Ternana Calcio players
Novara F.C. players
Serie C players
Serie B players